Euriphene grosesmithi, or Grose-Smith's nymph, is a butterfly in the family Nymphalidae. It is found in eastern Ivory Coast, Ghana, Nigeria, Cameroon, Gabon, the Republic of the Congo, the Central African Republic and the Democratic Republic of the Congo. The habitat consists of forests.

Subspecies
Euriphene grosesmithi grosesmithi (Nigeria, Cameroon, Gabon, Congo, Central African Republic, western Democratic Republic of the Congo)
Euriphene grosesmithi muehlenbergi Hecq, 1995 (Ivory Coast, Ghana)

References

Butterflies described in 1891
Euriphene
Butterflies of Africa